The black-throated trogon, also known as  yellow-bellied trogon, (Trogon rufus) is a near passerine bird in the trogon  family, Trogonidae. Although it is also called "yellow-bellied trogon" it is not the only trogon with a yellow belly. It breeds in lowlands from Honduras south to western Ecuador and northern Argentina.

Taxonomy
The black-throated trogon was formally described in 1788 by the German naturalist Johann Friedrich Gmelin in his revised and expanded edition of Carl Linnaeus's Systema Naturae. He placed it with the other trogons in the genus Trogon and coined the binomial name Trogon rufus. Gmelin based his description on the "Couroucou à queue rousse de Cayenne" that had been described and illustrated in 1779 by the French polymath Comte de Buffon in his Histoire Naturelle des Oiseaux . Buffon's specimen was a female with brown upperparts that had been collected in Cayenne. The specific epithet rufus is Latin for "red" or "ruddy".

Six subspecies are recognised:

 T. r. tenellus Cabanis, 1862 – southeast Honduras to northwest Colombia
 T. r. cupreicauda (Chapman, 1914) – west Colombia and west Ecuador
 T. r. rufus Gmelin, JF, 1788 – east Venezuela, the Guianas and north Brazil
 T. r. sulphureus Spix, 1824 – southeast Colombia, east Ecuador, northeast Peru and west Brazil
 T. r. amazonicus Todd, 1943 – northeast Brazil
 T. r. chrysochloros Pelzeln, 1856 – south Brazil, Paraguay and northeast Argentina

Description
Like most trogons, it has distinctive male and female plumages and with soft colourful feathers. This relatively small species is 23–24 cm long and weighs 54-57 g, with a white undertail with black barring, a yellow bill and wing coverts which are vermiculated with black and white, but appear grey at any distance. The male black-throated trogon has a green head, upper breast and back, black face and throat, and golden yellow belly. The female has a brown head, upper breast and back, rufous upper tail and yellow belly. Immatures resemble the adults but are duller, and young males have a brown throat, breast and wing coverts.

The call is a churring krrrrrr, and the song is a typical trogon series of a few clear whistles, cuh cuh cuh cuh.

Distribution and habitat
It is a resident of the lower levels of damp tropical forests, and prefers the deep shade of the understory. Their broad bills and weak legs reflect their diet and arboreal habits. Although their flight is fast, they are reluctant to fly any distance. They typically perch upright and motionless.

Behavior
Black-throated trogons feed mainly on arthropods as well as some fruit, often taken in flight; they are one of the most insectivorous trogon species of their range. They opportunistically catch arthropods that have been startled by other predators, such as coatis (Nasua spp.).

References

Sources
 de Mello Beisiegel, Beatriz (2007): Foraging Association between Coatis (Nasua nasua) and Birds of the Atlantic Forest, Brazil. Biotropica 39(2): 283–285 [English with Portuguese abstract].  (HTML abstract)
 Hilty, Steven L. (2003): Birds of Venezuela. Christopher Helm, London. 
 Pizo, Marco Aurélio (2007): The relative contribution of fruits and arthropods to the diet of three trogon species (Aves, Trogonidae) in the Brazilian Atlantic Forest. Revista Brasileira de Zoologia 24(2): 515-517 [English with Portuguese abstract].  PDF fulltext
 Stiles, F. Gary & Skutch, Alexander Frank (1989): A guide to the birds of Costa Rica. Comistock, Ithaca. 

black-throated trogon
Birds of Honduras
Birds of Nicaragua
Birds of Costa Rica
Birds of Panama
Birds of Colombia
Birds of Ecuador
Birds of the Amazon Basin
Birds of the Guianas
Birds of the Atlantic Forest
black-throated trogon
black-throated trogon
Birds of Brazil